Draper is a rural residential locality in the Moreton Bay Region, Queensland, Australia.

Geography 
Part of the southern boundary is marked by the South Pine River while the northern boundary follows Cedar Creek.

Drapers Crossing is a ford over the South Pine River.

Eatons Crossing is a ford over Cedar Creek.

The land use is predominantly large-lot residential with some areas of farming, mostly grazing on native vegetation.

History 
The locality is named after settler Jacob Draper. He was born in Wiltshire, England in 1841. He immigrated to Moreton Bay  in 1861. He died at Bunya in 1913. Drapers Crossing is also named after him.

The median age of the Draper population was 39 years, 2 years above the national median of 37.  76.6% of people living in Draper were born in Australia. The other top responses for country of birth were England 5.2%, South Africa 3.4%, New Zealand 2.5%, Scotland 1.7%, Canada 1.2%.  93.1% of people spoke only English at home; the next most common languages were 1.2% Afrikaans, 0.5% Dutch, 0.5% German, 0.5% French, 0.5% Italian.

Education 
There are no schools in Draper. The nearest primary schools are Samford State School in Samford Village to the south-west, Eatons Hill State School in neighbouring Eatons Hill to the north-east, and Patrick Road State School in neighbouring Ferny Hills to the south-east. The nearest secondary schools are Ferny Grove State High School in Ferny Grove to the south and Albany Creek State High School in Albany Creek to the east.

Amenities 
There are a number of parks in Draper, including:

 Jacob Draper Reserve
 Reginald Draper Reserve
 Richard Lawson Park
 Thomas Draper Reserve
 Thomas Morrison Reserve
 Yugar Park

References

Suburbs of Moreton Bay Region
Localities in Queensland